Akbank T.A.Ş. is one of the largest banks in Turkey. Founded in 1948, it had revenues of nearly TL 13.7 billion. Listed on the Borsa Istanbul, its largest shareholders are members of the Sabancı family. Akbank is a bank that offers vehicle loans, housing loans, consumer loans and commercial loans.

Akbank has ranked as "The Most Valuable Banking Brand in Turkey" according to the "Brand Finance — Banking 500, 2018" report for the seventh time in a row. Akbank also achieved significant success by ranking as the 126th most valuable banking brand in the report that comprises the most valuable global banking brands.

History
Akbank was founded in Adana, Turkey in January 1948, originally to provide financing for the cotton producers in the Çukurova region. As the majority of the bank founders were born in the city of Kayseri, the name "Adana-Kayseri Bankası" was chosen, soon to be shortened to its initials AK or Akbank. The founders were Hacı Ömer Sabancı, the industrialist brothers Ahmet Sapmaz and Bekir Sapmaz and the four owners of the Adana textile business Milli Mensucat; Nuh Naci Yazgan, Nuri Has, Mustafa Özgür and Seyit Tekin. This group had an 80% shareholding with the remaining 20% offered to investors in Adana and Istanbul. Opening with a single branch in a corner of Adana Akbank grew and developed quickly, opening its first branch in Istanbul in the district of Sirkeci on 14 July 1950, and moving its headquarters to Istanbul in 1954. The original founders ran the bank until 1962 when it was taken over by Sabancı family. 
Rapidly increasing the number of its branches, Akbank automated all banking operations in 1963.

In 1993, Akbank founded the Akbank Sanat art centre in Beyoğlu, Istanbul.

Akbank established Ak Securities in 1996, Ak Investment Fund in 1998, Ak Asset Management Company and its Private Banking Department in 2000. Akbank established Ak Pension Fund in 2003 and incorporated Ak Leasing in 2005. In February 2006, Ak Pension Fund was sold to the Aksigorta insurance company.

On 9 January 2007, Akbank and Citigroup completed the strategic partnership agreement, according to which Citigroup acquired a 20% equity stake in Akbank for approximately US$3.1 billion (TRL 0.095 per share).

In 2008 Akbank in collaboration with Boyner Holding introduced "Fish", a credit card that offers an array of different services and products. In 2008, apart from Boyner, Akbank also signed a partnership agreement with Carrefour SA. Additionally, Akbank introduced new services such as Wings Business Card, Citi Axess, ATMCredit and Multimedia POS to its customers.

As of 31 December 2010, Akbank reported a consolidated net profit of TRY 3,010 million (US$1,958 million) and total consolidated assets of TRY 120,070 million (US$78,089 million). The consolidated capital adequacy ratio of Akbank, standing at approx 20% is among the highest ratios achieved in the sector.

In 2010, Akbank continued to raise funds from international markets, with a total of such resources reaching US$8.0 million by the end of the year.

In 2013, Citigroup sold a 10.1 percent% stake in Akbank as part of a move to prepare for the Basel III rule and technical reasons related to Citibank. Following this transaction, Citigroup's stake in Akbank was 9.9% but on 5 March 2015 Citi announced it was selling its remaining shares for $1.15 billion.

Operations

, Akbank ranked as Turkey's most valuable bank, having the most profitable banking operations among privately owned banks in Turkey. Also, Akbank is one of the largest banks in Turkey in terms of loan volume.

Together with its core banking activities, Akbank offers a wide range of retail, commercial, corporate, private banking and international trade finance services. Non-banking financial services, as well as capital market and investment services, are provided by the Bank's subsidiaries.
 
It has a domestic distribution network that includes over 800 branches and around 14,000 employees, Akbank operates from its headquarters in Istanbul and 20 regional directorates around Turkey. Akbank provides services not only through its branches, which include "Credit Express" consumer loan only branches and "Big Red House" mortgage loan only branches, but also through Retail and Corporate Internet Branches, the Telephone Banking Center, 4,550 ATM's, 510,000 POS terminals as well as technology channels such as cell phones, and loan machines. Additionally, Free Banking Areas have been set up inside branches in which customers have access to Internet and telephone banking services. Akbank AG in Germany, as well as a branch in Malta, carry out Akbank's overseas operations.

Akbank is listed on the Istanbul Stock Exchange (ISE) where approx. 51.1% of its shares are publicly traded. Akbank shares constitute 4.9% of the total BIST 100 market capitalization and 16.9% of the total market capitalization of banks listed on BIST as of June 2018.

Akbank has been conducting overseas activities through its subsidiaries in Germany (Akbank A.G.), and a branch in Malta.

Management Board & Group Executive Committee

Principal subsidiaries
 Ak Asset Management
 Ak Lease
 Ak Investment
 Akbank AG

See also

List of banks in Turkey
List of companies of Turkey

References

Banks established in 1948
Banks of Turkey
Companies listed on the Istanbul Stock Exchange
Companies based in Istanbul
Sabancı family
Turkish brands
Turkish companies established in 1948